Diagonal scale is an engineering measuring instrument which is composed of a set of parallel straight lines which are obliquely crossed by another set of straight lines. Diagonal scales are used to measure small fractions of the unit of measurement.

Etymology 
Diagonal scale is derived from the Latin word Diagonalis. The Latin word was originally coined from the Greek word diagōnios where dia means "through" and gonios denotes "corners".

Principle of Diagonal scale 
Diagonal scale follows the principle of similar triangles where a short length is divided into number of parts in which sides are proportional.
Divided into required number of equal parts

Application 
Diagonal scale is used in engineering to read lengths with higher accuracy as it represents a unit into three different multiple in metres, centimeters and millimeters. Diagonal scale is an important part in Engineering drawings.

References 

Dimensional instruments